Clemens A. van Blitterswijk (1957, The Hague) is a Dutch tissue engineer who contributed to the use of biomaterials to heal bone injuries, especially using osteoinductive ceramics. In collaboration with Jan de Boer and others, he has contributed to screening microtextures to study cell-biomaterial interactions, an approach termed materiomics.

Career 
Blitterswijk graduated from a bachelor in cell biology at Leiden University and defended his PhD thesis in 1985 at the same university on artificial ceramic middle ear implants under the supervision of Professor Jan Grote and Klaas de Groot, for which he was awarded the Jean Leray young scientist award from the European Society for Biomaterials in 1987. From 1985 to 1996, he worked on hydroxyapatite biomaterials for middle ear implants under the mentorship of Jan Grote and Klaas De Groot at Leiden University.

In 1996, he left Leiden University and co-founded, together with Klaas De Groot, IsoTis BV, a life sciences company focused on bone biomaterials and tissue engineering.

In 1997, he became a professor at University of Twente. Later, he was appointed director of the University of Twente's MIRA Institute for Biomedical Technology and Technical Medicine institute (the institute no longer exists). In collaboration with Jan de Boer, Hemant Unadkat, and Dimitrios Stamatialis, he contributed to the development of a high-throughput assay to design and select micrometer-scale surface textures that could enhance specific biological functions (TopoChip).

In 2012, he became a partner of the Life Science Partner (LSP) private investment firm where he invests in private companies and startups related to healthcare innovations.

In 2014, he became a distinguished professor at Maastricht University. Until 2018, he was the director and department chair at the MERLN Institute at Maastricht University. In 2015, he was awarded an ERC Advanced grant that aimed at developing microfabricated and microfluidic cell culture platforms for improving organoids. The conception of this grant application and the research relative to it were done by several principal investigators at Maastricht University.

Valorization 
He has served as CEO of IsoTis., a company that underwent an Initial Public Offering and was subsequently acquired by Integra LifeSciences. In 2018, he became the chairman of the board of directors of Kuros Biosciences.

Teaching 
Blitterswijk has been the official supervisor of over 80 PhD candidates who, in their large majority, have worked in the laboratories of other faculty members. He has participated as an editor of four textbooks, including one dedicated to tissue engineering.

Awards 
 Jean Leray award in 1989 for the work in his PhD thesis
Professor de Kleijn award in 1989 for the work in his PhD thesis
George Winter senior scientist award in 1997
 Federa award in 2012
"Most entrepreneurial scientist" award in 2012
Career Achievement award of the EU Chapter of the Tissue Engineering and Regenerative Medicine International Society in 2013
 Huibregtsen award in 2015
 ESB Klaas de Groot award in 2021

Ten outstanding publications as a co-author or corresponding author

References

External links
 Introduction to Professor van Blitterswijk: https://www.youtube.com/watch?v=HjYBwYS1eI0
 TEDx talk: https://www.youtube.com/watch?v=BR9oAyVldl0

1957 births
Living people
Dutch bioengineers
Engineers from The Hague
Academic staff of the University of Twente
Members of the Royal Netherlands Academy of Arts and Sciences